This is a chronological list of women playwrights who were active in England and Wales, and the Kingdom of Great Britain and Ireland before approximately 1800, with a brief indication of productivity. (For a chronological list, see the link on the right.) Nota Bene: Authors of dramatic works are the focus of this list, though many of these writers worked in more than one genre.)

Playwrights
Nota Bene: In cases where an author's date of birth is unknown, their period of professional activity has been used.
Katherine of Sutton (abbess 1358–1376): rewrote several mystery plays
Jane Lumley (1537–1578): first translator of Euripides into English
 Mary Sidney Herbert (1561–1621): translated one play
Elizabeth Cary (1585–1639): wrote first original play in English by a woman 
Mary Wroth (1587–1652): primarily a poet; one drama extant
Rachel Bourchier (Countess of Bath, née Fane; 1613–1680): wrote masques
Jane Cavendish (1620/21–1669): co-authored a pastoral masque with her sister, Elizabeth Egerton
Margaret Cavendish (1623–1673): author of closet dramas
Elizabeth Egerton (1626–1663): co-authored a pastoral masque with her sister, Jane Cavendish
Katherine Philips (1631–1664): mainly a poet; author of two plays (one unfinished)
Aphra Behn (1640–1689): usually credited with being the first female professional playwright in English
Elizabeth Polwheele (c. 1651 – c. 1691): two plays extant
Anne Wharton (née Lee; 1659-1685): poet and verse dramatist
Anne Finch (1661–1720): primarily a poet; author of verse dramas
Delarivier Manley (1663 or c. 1670–1724): playwright
Mary Pix (1666–1709): playwright
Susannah Centlivre (c. 1667–1723): playwright
Frances Boothby (fl. 1669–1670): author of the first original play by a woman to be produced in London
Mary Davys (1674–1732): novelist; produced one play; had another published
Penelope Aubin (c. 1679 – c. 1731): primarily a novelist; had one play produced
Catherine Trotter (1679–1749): playwright
Jane Wiseman (fl. c. 1682–1717): author of one produced play
Mary Wortley Montagu (c. 1689–1762): wrote primarily in other genres
Eliza Haywood (1693–1756): playwright; wrote primarily in other genres
Ariadne (fl. 1694-95): pseudonym of unknown author of She Ventures and He Wins
Elizabeth Cooper (née Price) (1698? – 1761?): actress, playwright, and poet
Elizabeth Boyd (c. 1710 – 1745): wrote one play; wrote primarily in other genres
Catherine Clive (1711–1785): actress; wrote farces with some success
Charlotte Charke (1713–1760): playwright/actress/manager
Eglantine Wallace (née Maxwell; died 1803): comedies and tragedy
Charlotte Lennox (1720–1804): wrote primarily in other genres; two plays (one an adaptation)
Frances Brooke (1723–1789): primarily a novelist; wrote comic opera
Frances Sheridan (1724–1766): playwright
Mary Latter (1725–1777): one tragedy produced
Elizabeth Griffith (c. 1727 – 1793): playwright
Charlotte Lennox (c. 1727 – 1804): playwright; primarily a novelist
Jael Pye (née Mendez) (c. 1737 – 1782): published four works, each in a different genre
Dorothea Celesia (baptised 1738, d. 1790): translated Voltaire's Tancrède
Hannah Cowley (1743–1809): playwright and poet
Hannah More (1745–1833): playwright; published in many genres
Mary Bowes (1749–1800): published one play
Charlotte Smith (1749–1806): novelist and poet; one comedy attributed to her
Elizabeth Craven (1750–1828): writer of farces and pantomimes
Sophia Lee (1750–1824): playwright
Frances Burney (1752–1840): primarily a novelist; author of several plays, only one produced in her lifetime
Sophia Burrell (1753–1802): author of two tragedies
Elizabeth Inchbald (1753–1821): playwright
Ann Yearsley (c. 1753 – 1806): primarily a poet; produced and published one play
Hannah Brand (1754–1821): published playwright
Margaret Holford(1757–1834): one play produced
Harriet Lee (1757–1851): playwright
Mary Robinson (1757–1800): wrote primarily in other genres; one play produced
Jane West (1758–1852): wrote primarily in other genres
Anne Plumptre (1760–1818): wrote primarily in other genres; translated dramas
Elizabeth Kemble (1761–1836): known for acting
Mariana Starke (1761/2–1838): author of four plays, not all produced; mainly a travel writer
Joanna Baillie (1762–1851): prolific playwright
Susanna Rowson (née Haswell) (1762–1824): British-American novelist, poet, playwright
Jean Marishall (Jane Marshall) (fl. 1765–1788): one play
Fanny Robertson (1765-1855): actor-manager, author of at least two plays
Barbarina Brand (1768–1854): author of four published plays, one produced
Anna Ross (b. 1773): performer; wrote comic opera
Frances Burney (1776–1828): published two unproduced tragedies
Jane Porter (1776–1850): two plays
Margaret Holford (1778–1852): one play, neither published nor produced
Jane Scott (1779–1839): theatre manager, actor, and playwright
Mary Russell Mitford (1787–1855): playwright
Felicia Hemans (1793–1835): primarily a poet; some verse drama
Catherine Gore (1799–1861): eleven plays produced
Catherine Crowe (1800–1876): primarily a fiction writer; two plays, one produced
Elizabeth Barrett Browning (1806–1861): primarily a poet; one closet drama and one translation
Elizabeth Polack (fl. 1830–1838): author of five plays, three surviving

See also

List of biographical dictionaries of women writers in English
List of early-modern women novelists (England, Wales, and Great Britain)
List of early-modern women poets (England, Wales, and Great Britain)
List of female poets
List of feminist poets
List of playwrights
List of playwrights by nationality and date of birth
List of poets
List of women rhetoricians
List of women writers
Lists of writers
Oxford period poetry anthologies
Women Writers Project
Women's writing (literary category)

References 
Blain, Virginia, et al., eds. The Feminist Companion to Literature in English. New Haven and London: Yale UP, 1990. (Internet Archive)
Buck, Claire, ed.The Bloomsbury Guide to Women's Literature. Prentice Hall, 1992. (Internet Archive)
Chadwyck-Healey Database of English Prose Drama (through 1750) and (1750–1939)
Oxford Dictionary of National Biography. Oxford: OUP, 2004. 
Robertson, Fiona, ed. Women's Writing, 1778–1838. Oxford: OUP, 2001. (Internet Archive)
Schlueter, Paul, and June Schlueter. An encyclopedia of British women writers. Rutgers University Press, 1998. (Internet Archive)
Todd, Janet, ed. British Women Writers: a critical reference guide. London: Routledge, 1989. (Internet Archive)

External links 
Bibliography of Early Modern Women Writers That Are In Print
British Women Playwrights around 1800
The Brown University Women Writers Project
A Celebration of Women Writers
Emory Women Writers Resource Project
Images of Early Modern, 20th and 21st Century British Female Playwrights
List of biographical dictionaries, with a focus on 17thc women writers
London Theater People - 1660–1800
Luminarium
The Perdita Project
The Restoration Comedy Project
Romantic Circles
Women Romantic-Era Writers
The Women Writers Archive: Early Modern Women Writers Online

Women dramatists and playwrights
Women
 
 
Lists of women writers by format